City of the Sun is a 2008 crime/suspense novel by David Levien, published by Random House Books. Levien is currently working on a film script for the book.

Plot summary
A 14-year-old boy is kidnapped on his usual newspaper round. His parents' relationship suffers through the unknowing of their child's fate. A former police officer, who lost his own son at a young age and who has issues with the police hierarchy, accepts the case.

Analysis

References

External links
 City of the Sun at Random House

2008 American novels
American crime novels
Novels set in Indianapolis